Santos Abril y Castelló (born 21 September 1936) is a Spanish prelate of the Catholic Church. After a career in the diplomatic corps of the Holy See, he held a number of positions in the Roman Curia and from 2011 to 2016 was Archpriest of the Basilica of Santa Maria Maggiore.

Biography
Abril y Castelló was born in Alfambra, Spain. He was ordained a priest for the diocese of Teruel and Albarracín on 19 March 1960. In 1961, he went to Rome to study and obtained a doctorate in social sciences at the Pontifical University of Saint Thomas Aquinas, Angelicum and a doctorate in canon law at the Pontifical Gregorian University. He attended the Pontifical Ecclesiastical Academy in Rome.

Joining he diplomatic service of the Holy See, he worked in Pakistan, Turkey and the Second Section of the Secretariat of State in Rome. On 29 April 1985, Pope John Paul II named him Apostolic Nuncio to Bolivia and Titular Archbishop of Tamada. He received his episcopal consecration on 16 June 1985 from Cardinal Secretary of State Agostino Casaroli. Pope John Paul named him apostolic pro-nuncio to Cameroon, to Gabon, and to Equatorial Guinea on 2 October 1989 and nuncio to Yugoslavia on 24 February 1996. On 4 March 2000 he named him nuncio to Argentina. On 9 April 2003, he named him nuncio to both Slovenia and Bosnia-Herzegovina, to which he added the title nuncio to Macedonia on 12 April.

On 22 January 2011, Pope Benedict named him Vice-Camerlengo of the Apostolic Chamber, the official responsible controlling access to papal conclaves and overseeing their operations.

On 2 April 2011 he was appointed a member of the Congregation for Bishops.

On 21 November 2011 he was named Archpriest of the Basilica of St. Mary Major.

On 18 February 2012 Pope Benedict raised him to the rank of cardinal, making him Cardinal-Deacon of San Ponziano.

On 21 April 2012 he was appointed a member of the Congregation for the Causes of Saints, the Congregation for Bishops and the Congregation for the Evangelization of Peoples.

On 23 July 2012, Pope Benedict XVI named Archbishop Pier Luigi Celata to succeed him as Vice-Camerlengo.

He was one of the cardinal electors who participated in the 2013 papal conclave that elected Pope Francis. The day before the election of Pope Francis, La Stampa named Abril y Costello as a possible candidate for the papacy because he combined experience in both Latin American and the Roman Curia. The newspaper also reported that before the conclave Abril served as a mediator in discussions between factions of cardinals representing Latin America and others looking for a pope from outside the Curia.

On 15 January 2014, he was named to a five-year term as a member of the Commission of Cardinals overseeing the Institute for the Works of Religion (IOR), commonly known as the Vatican Bank, and on 4 March 2014, the members of that Commission elected him as their president.

His curial appointments ended when he reached the age of 80, as did his right to vote in a papal conclave.

On 28 December 2016, Pope Francis accepted his resignation as Archpriest and appointed Cardinal Stanislaw Rylko to succeed him.

On 4 March 2022, he was elevated to the rank of cardinal priest.

References

External links
 
 

 

 

 

1936 births
Living people
20th-century Spanish Roman Catholic priests
21st-century Spanish cardinals
People from the Province of Teruel
Pontifical Ecclesiastical Academy alumni
Pontifical Gregorian University alumni
Cardinals created by Pope Benedict XVI
Apostolic Nuncios to Argentina
Apostolic Nuncios to Bolivia
Apostolic Nuncios to Gabon
Apostolic Nuncios to Cameroon
Apostolic Nuncios to Equatorial Guinea
Apostolic Nuncios to Bosnia and Herzegovina
Apostolic Nuncios to North Macedonia
Apostolic Nuncios to Slovenia
Apostolic Nuncios to Yugoslavia
Spanish Roman Catholic titular archbishops
Members of the Congregation for Bishops
Members of the Congregation for the Causes of Saints
Members of the Congregation for the Evangelization of Peoples
Spanish expatriates in Italy